Zhongguo Meishuguan (National Art Museum) station is a station on Line 8 of the Beijing Subway. It was opened on December 30, 2018. This station served as the terminus of the North section of Line 8 until December 31, 2021.

The station is named after the National Art Museum of China.

Station Layout 
The station has an underground island platform.

Exits 
There are 3 exits, lettered A, B, and D. Exits A and D are accessible.

References

Beijing Subway stations in Dongcheng District